Thomas Jolmès (born 8 October 1995) is a French rugby union player. He currently plays as a lock for Bordeaux Bègles in the Top 14.

Career
After playing for Grenoble, La Rochelle and Toulon at the highest level, Thomas Jolmès signed for Bordeaux Bègles in 2021 and became an important player of the team.   

He was called by Fabien Galthié to the French national team for the first time in June 2022, for the summer tour of Japan.

References

External links
 Union Bordeaux Bègles
 EPCR
 All.Rugby
 It's Rugby

French rugby union players
Rugby union locks
FC Grenoble players
Stade Rochelais players
RC Toulonnais players
Union Bordeaux Bègles players
Sportspeople from Isère
Living people
1995 births